Naṭabhairavi is a rāgam in Carnatic music (musical scale of South Indian classical music). It is the 20th melakarta rāgam in the 72 melakarta rāgam system. It corresponds to the Natural minor scale of western music system.

Natabhairavi corresponds to the Asavari thaat of Hindustani music. In the Muthuswami Dikshitar school this melakarta is instead known as Nārīrītigowla. Natabhairavi is known to be a rāgam that incites feelings of grandeur and devotion in the listeners.

Structure and Lakshana

It is the 2nd rāgam in the 4th chakra Veda. The mnemonic name is Veda-Sri. The mnemonic phrase is sa ri gi ma pa dha ni. Its  structure is as follows (see swaras in Carnatic music for details on the notations used):
 : 
 : 
(this scale uses the notes chatushruti rishabham, sadharana gandharam, shuddha madhyamam, shuddha daivatam, kaishiki nishadam)

It is a sampoorna rāgam - rāgam having all 7 swarams. It is the shuddha madhyamam equivalent of Shanmukhapriya, which is the 56th melakarta.

Asampurna Melakarta 
Nārīrītigowla is the 20th Melakarta in the original list compiled by Venkatamakhin. The notes used in the scale are the same, but the scales have vakra prayoga (zig-zag usage of notes in the ascending and descending scale).
: 
:

Janya rāgams 
Natabhairavi has a number of popular janya rāgams (derived scales) such as Bhairavi,’’Anandabhairavi’’,Saramati, Jaunpuri, Hindolam (sometimes Hindolam is also associated as a Janya of Hanumatodi), Darbari Kanada and Jayanthasree. See List of janya rāgams for a full list of Natabhairavi's janya rāgams.

Popular compositions
śrī vallī devasenā pate is a popular composition in Natabhairavi, composed by Papanasam Sivan. Parulaseva by Poochi Srinivasa Iyengar is another well known composition in this rāgam. Upacharamu jeseva, in janya ragam Bhairavi composed by Thyagaraja is also popular.

Muthuswami Dikshitar's composition śrī nīlotpalanāyike is set to Nārīrītigowla.

Film Songs

Language:Tamil

Language:Kannada

Related rāgams
This section covers the theoretical and scientific aspect of this rāgam.

Natabhairavi's notes when shifted using Graha bhedam, yields 5 other major melakarta rāgams, namely, Kalyani, Sankarabharanam,
Hanumatodi, Kharaharapriya and Harikambhoji. For further details and an illustration of Graha bhedam of this rāgam refer Graha bhedam on Sankarabharanam.

Even though Natabhairavi has quite evenly spaced swara sthanas (pitch positions, notes) like the other 5 in this group, it has not found as much importance in concerts. One is likely to find Kalyani, Todi, Sankarabharanam and Karaharapriya as the main ragam in concerts, more often than Natabhairavi by a big count.

Except for madhyamam, all other swara prayoga(usage in practice) resemble Shanmukhapriya. Especially, when one uses the notes from panchamam(P) to gandharam(G₂) in ārohaṇa and vice versa in Avarohana, this ragam can be easily confused to be Shanmukhapriya while actually.

Notes

Melakarta ragas